Almost a Dance is the second studio album by the Dutch doom metal band The Gathering, released in 1993 on Foundation 2000 Records.

Tom Holkenberg, one of the producers, later became better known as the electronic musician Junkie XL.

On this album, The Gathering left death growls and their death-doom influences aside, in favor of a more straightforward doom metal sound with clean vocals.

Track listing 
Credits adapted from the original release.

Personnel 
The Gathering
 Niels Duffhuës – lead vocals, acoustic guitar, arrangements on track 5
 Martine van Loon – female vocals (tracks 1, 4, 6, and 9)
 René Rutten – guitars, theremin, digeridoo
 Jelmer Wiersma – guitars
 Frank Boeijen – keyboards
 Hugo Prinsen Geerligs – bass guitar, flute, triangle
 Hans Rutten – drums, arrangements

Production
Tom Holkenborg – producer, engineer, mixing
Mark Fritsma – executive producer

References 

The Gathering (band) albums
1993 albums